The Copa de la Reina de Balonmano (English: Queen's Cup of Handball) is an annual cup for Spanish women's handball clubs organized by the Royal Spanish Handball Federation. Founded in 1980, it is contested in spring by the top eight teams in the Liga ABF's table. BM Sagunto is the most successful team with twenty titles, while Mavi Nuevas Tecnologías has won the last edition.

List of champions

Winners by titles

See also
División de Honor
Supercopa de España

References

 
Reina
Recurring sporting events established in 1980
Hand
1980 establishments in Spain